The Jardin botanique de Briollay is a botanical garden located on the Chemin de la Guichardière, Briollay, Maine-et-Loire, Pays de la Loire, France. It contains more than 70 types of shrubs and berry bushes, set on a hillside with excellent views of the valleys below.

See also 
 List of botanical gardens in France

References 
 Jardin botanique de Briollay: Photograph
 Gralon entry (French)
 AngersLoireTourisme entry (French)

Briollay, Jardin botanique de
Briollay, Jardin botanique de